Kenton/North Denver Avenue is a light rail station on the MAX Yellow Line in Portland, Oregon. It is the 8th stop northbound on the Interstate Avenue MAX extension.

The station is located on the shoulder of Interstate Avenue near the intersection with North Argyle and Denver Streets. The station is a side platform configuration.

The artwork at this station reflects the historic Kenton neighborhood which it serves. Themes include the area's historic stockyards.  A large Paul Bunyan Statue, listed on the National Register of Historic Places, is located across the street from the station.

This station is the final stop on Interstate Avenue before the Yellow Line continues to the Expo Center on the Vanport Bridge, passing over Union Pacific railroad tracks, Columbia Boulevard, and the Columbia Slough.

External links
Station information (with northbound ID number) from TriMet
Station information (with southbound ID number) from TriMet
MAX Light Rail Stations – more general TriMet page

MAX Light Rail stations
MAX Yellow Line
Railway stations in the United States opened in 2004
2004 establishments in Oregon
Kenton, Portland, Oregon
Railway stations in Portland, Oregon